Lisa Anne MacLeod  (born 1974) is a Canadian politician who has represented Nepean in the Legislative Assembly of Ontario. Elected in 2018, MacLeod is a member of the Progressive Conservative (PC) Party. She previously served as the Ontario minister of children, community and social services from 2018 to 2019 and Ontario minister of heritage, sport, tourism and culture industries from 2019 to 2022.

Background
MacLeod was born on October 29, 1974, in New Glasgow, Nova Scotia. She went to St. Francis Xavier University, where she obtained a degree in political science. In 1998, she moved to Ottawa with a goal of becoming involved in politics. She worked as an assistant to Ottawa City Councillor Jan Harder and as a riding assistant to federal Member of Parliament (MP) Pierre Poilievre. She is married to Joseph Varner and they have one daughter, Victoria. Varner was a candidate in the 2003 provincial election but lost to Richard Patten. In 2022, MacLeod revealed that she had been dealing with depression since 2014, and had also been diagnosed with bipolar disorder and a metabolic condition, which requires her to take life long medications. She described it as a "mental health crisis".

Political career

Opposition MPP 
MacLeod was elected to the Ontario legislature in a by-election that was held to replace John Baird who resigned to run for the federal House of Commons. She won the election on March 30, 2006, beating her Liberal opponent Brian Ford in the Ottawa-area riding of Nepean—Carleton by a margin of 6,000 votes. She was re-elected in 2007, 2011, and 2014.

In 2007 MacLeod was satirized by Liberal strategist Warren Kinsella when she was mockingly portrayed in a spoofed picture suggesting she would rather be at home baking cookies than attending a political event with then PC Leader John Tory. Kinsella later removed the posting and apologized to MacLeod.  Following the incident MacLeod wrote a cookbook called I'd Rather Be Baking Cookies: A Collection of Recipes from Lisa MacLeod and Friends. MacLeod said, "Why not play off that experience, make a cookbook and poke fun at the absurdity of it?" The money raised from the sale of the cookbooks went to her election campaign. In 2019, Kinsella told Globe and Mail described her as the sister he never had.

In 2012, she criticized Dalton McGuinty's Bill 13 legislation as being "unfair" to Catholic separate school boards because it forced them to allow gay–straight alliances. She labelled the Liberals as "bullies".

In April 2014, Premier Kathleen Wynne launched a libel lawsuit against MacLeod and PC Party Leader Tim Hudak after they said that she "oversaw and possibly ordered the criminal destruction of [gas plant] documents." In July 2015, Wynne, MacLeod, and Hudak reached an agreement whereby the lawsuit was dropped. They said in a joint statement,

The statement avoided any apology or placement of blame.

MacLeod announced her candidacy for the leadership of the Ontario Progressive Conservative party on October 6, 2014, but withdrew on February 6, 2015, following federal cabinet minister John Baird's announcement that he was resigning from cabinet and would not be running for re-election to the House of Commons of Canada. MacLeod told reporters that she has been "under enormous pressure from my constituents to seek the federal nomination to replace John Baird", in the new riding of Nepean. MacLeod decided not to seek Baird's seat in the House of Commons and remained at Queen's Park.

In July 2014, MacLeod became the party's critic for Treasury Board issues, and in October of that year, she became the Vice-Chair for the Standing Committee on Public Accounts. She was Critic for Digital Government from June 2016 until February 2017, when she became the party' critic for Ottawa issues and the Anti-Racism Secretariat. In January 2018, after party leader Patrick Brown stepped down and Vic Fedeli became leader, MacLeod was chosen to replace Fedeli as the party's finance critic.

In government 
In the 2018 provincial election, MacLeod won all the polls in Nepean, and won the riding with 45.2 per cent of the vote. NDP candidate Zaff Ansari came in second and Liberal candidate Lovina Srivastsva came in third. On June 29, 2018, it was announced she would be the minister responsible for children, community, and social services, and Minister Responsible for woman's issues. In total she has five portfolios including immigration and anti-racism.

As Social Services Minister, MacLeod admitted to breaking a Progressive Conservative election promise by cutting the Ontario Basic Income Pilot Project on July 31, 2018.

On February 6, 2019, MacLeod announced sweeping changes to the Ontario Autism Program intended to clear long waitlists by redistributing program funds. No new funds were added to the program budget, and MacLeod and her parliamentary assistant Amy Fee faced immediate backlash from parents and service providers including provincewide protests.

On February 13, 2019, the National Post reported that Ontario Association for Behaviour Analysts (ONTABA) had received a threatening message from MacLeod's office. In the email, ONTABA was directed to make a public statement in support of the changes to the Ontario Autism Program or face "four long years". MacLeod further threatened that if the message of support was not forthcoming, her office would release a press statement labeling ONTABA as "self-interested". Immediate calls from parents of children with autism for MacLeod's resignation were rebuffed by the minister. On October 31, 2019, Warren Kinsella told The Globe and Mail that his firm provided strategic advice and media training for the government to MacLeod and her political staff in 2018 when dealing with the cuts.

MacLeod was shuffled from Minister of Children, Community and Social Services to Minister of Tourism, Culture and Sport in 2019. The ministry was later renamed the Ministry of Heritage, Sport, Tourism and Cultural Industries to reflect the significant economic impact the cultural industries such as film, television and the arts have on the province. 

An internal review of the overhauled autism program by fellow Progressive Conservative MPP Roman Baber called for an immediate reset to MacLeod's program, as it would leave families "destitute".

In June 2019, at a Rolling Stones concert, MacLeod allegedly publicly said to Eugene Melnyk: "I am your minister and you’re a fucking piece of shit and you're a fucking loser." After a personal complaint by Melnyk to Ontario Premier Doug Ford, she apologized for her "blunt" language but the apology was not accepted. There were calls for her resignation from Ontario Liberals.

During the 2022 Ontario election, the NDP revealed that the Conservative riding association of Vanier had paid her $44,000 directly as a housing subsidy. Such payments are highly unusual as MPPs receive $26,000 in a housing allowance above and beyond their salary.

Following her re-election during the 2022 Ontario election, MacLeod announced that she would be taking some time off to “address and improve” her health.

Cabinet positions

Electoral record

Notes

References

External links

Lisa MacLeod profile at Legislative Assembly of Ontario

1975 births
21st-century Canadian politicians
21st-century Canadian women politicians
Canadian people of Scottish descent
Living people
Members of the Executive Council of Ontario
People from New Glasgow, Nova Scotia
Politicians from Ottawa
Progressive Conservative Party of Ontario MPPs
Women cookbook writers
Women government ministers of Canada
Women MPPs in Ontario
Writers from Nova Scotia
Writers from Ottawa